Organocerium compounds are chemical compounds that contain one or more chemical bond between carbon and cerium. Organocerium chemistry is the corresponding science exploring properties, structure and reactivity of these compounds. In general, organocerium compounds are not isolable, and are rather studied in solution via their reactions with other species. There are notable exceptions, such as the Cp*3Ce(III) complex shown at right, but they are relatively rare.  Complexes involving cerium of various oxidation states are known: though lanthanides are most stable in the +3 state, complexes of cerium(IV) have been reported. These latter compounds have found less widespread use due to their oxidizing nature, and the majority of literature regarding organometallic cerium complexes involves the +3 oxidation state. In particular, organocerium compounds have been developed extensively as non-basic carbon nucleophiles in organic synthesis. Because cerium is relatively non-toxic, they serve as an "environmentally friendly" alternative to other organometallic reagents. Several reviews detailing these applications have been published.

Structure
The solution structure of organocerium reagents remains unclear, although there is agreement that it depends heavily on the manner in which it is prepared. In particular, those derived from organolithium reagents likely are believed to form something similar to a 'true' organocerium structure, "R-CeCl2," while those derived from Grignard reagents are more appropriately characterized as -ate complexes of the form "R-MgX•CeCl3". Furthermore, the solvent seems to alter the solution structure of the complex, with differences noted between reagents prepared in diethyl ether and tetrahydrofuran. There is evidence that the parent chloride forms a polymeric species in THF solution, of the form [Ce(μ-Cl)2(H2O)(THF)2]n, but whether this type of polymer exists once the organometallic reagent is formed is unknown.

Preparation
Organocerium compounds are typically prepared via transmetallation from the respective organolithium or Grignard reagent. The most common cerium source for this purpose is cerium (III) chloride, which can be obtained in anhydrous form via dehydration of the commercially available heptahydrate. Precomplexation with tetrahydrofuran is important for the success of the transmetallation, with most procedures involving "vigorous stirring for a period of no less than 2 hours".

Reagents derived from alkyl, alkynyl, and alkenyl organometallic reagents as well as cerium enolates have been described. The stability of each is approximately the same regardless of origin (i.e. lithiate or Grignard), with the exception of alkenyl reagents, which tend to be more stable when derived from the corresponding lithiate. The reasons for this are still poorly understood. Functional groups compatible with the parent organometallic compound are generally also stable upon transmetallation to cerium. The figure below summarizes the kinds of organocerium compounds that have been prepared.

Reactions
Organocerium reagents are used almost exclusively for addition reactions in the same vein as organolithium and Grignard reagents. To this end, they have a number of particularly useful characteristics that distinguish them from their more common counterparts.

They are incredibly nucleophilic, allowing additions to imines in the absence of additional Lewis acid catalysts, making them useful for substrates in which typical conditions fail.

Despite this high reactivity, organocerium reagents are almost entirely non-basic, tolerating the presence of free alcohols and amines as well as enolizable α-protons.

The oxophilicity of cerium imparts strong 1,2-selectivity in reactions with conjugated electrophiles similarly to organolithium reagents. At the same time, organocerium reagents can be used to synthesize ketones from acyl compounds without over-addition, as seen with organocuprates. This dichotomy illustrates the unique reactivity of organolanthanide reagents.

Finally, organocerium reagents have been employed in a number of total syntheses. Shown below is a key coupling step in the total synthesis of roseophilin, a potent antitumor antibiotic.

See also
 Luche reduction
 Cerium

References

cerium
cerium
Cerium